Appleton is a hamlet  in the town of Newfane in Niagara County, New York, United States.

References

Hamlets in New York (state)
Hamlets in Niagara County, New York

Appleton is where the Winery At Marjim Manor is. The Mansion built in the 19th century, nearly 200 years ago. It is known nutoriously for its alleged ghost sightings. The Manor has been featured on many shows, such as ghost adventures.